Harlequin Dream is the second studio album by the Australian indie rock band Boy & Bear. It was released on 16 August 2013 by Island Records in Australia and reached #1 on the ARIA Albums Chart in its debut week. The lead single is the first track, "Southern Sun"; second single "Three Headed Woman" was released in August just prior to the album.

A collector's edition of the album featuring vinyl and CD copies of the album as well as a lyric booklet, artwork print and "one-of-a-kind Polaroid photo of the band" was also released alongside the standard edition.

Within weeks of finishing work on their debut, the band was bitten by a fresh creative bug. Recording in their home town of Sydney rather than abroad, keeping things local allowed the band to be close to friends and family. As a result, the album reflects the personalities and experiences of the band.

The band embarked on the 16 Days Under a Southern Sun tour in October and November 2013.

At the J Awards of 2013, the album was nominated for Australian Album of the Year.

Track listing

Charts

Weekly charts

Year-end charts

Certifications

References

2013 albums
Boy & Bear albums